Zhuang Jiajie (born 5 September 1993) is a Chinese footballer who plays as a left-footed attacking midfielder or forward for Hubei Istar.

Club career
Zhuang joined Hangzhou Greentown youth team system from Shenzhen Yantian Sports School in 2006. In 2011, he was loan to China League Two side Wenzhou Provenza for one year and scored his first league goal in a 3–1 away defeat against Hubei CTGU Kangtian on 25 June. He was sent to Major League Soccer club FC Dallas one year for further training on 17 August 2011. Zhuang returned to Hangzhou Greentown and joined the club's reserved team in July 2012. He was promoted to first team squad by Takeshi Okada in 2013 and could not make any appearance in the 2013 season. On 18 May 2014, he made his Chinese Super League debut in a 4–1 home defeat against Guangzhou Evergrande. Zhuang was demoted to the Greentown reserved team in the 2017 season.

On 9 March 2018, Zhuang transferred to China League Two side Hunan Billows. He scored 12 goals in 27 appearances for the club in the 2018 season.

Zhuang signed a contract with China League One side Qingdao Huanghai in February 2019.

International career
Zhuang was first called up into China U-17's squad in March 2010, and received his first called up for China U-20 by Su Maozhen in December 2010. He played for China U-20 in the 2011 Toulon Tournament and 2011 Weifang Cup. He scored 1 goals in 3 appearances in 2012 AFC U-19 Championship qualification as China U-20 managed to qualify into the 2012 AFC U-19 Championship in November 2011.

Career statistics
.

Honours

Club
Qingdao Huanghai
China League One: 2019

References

External links

1993 births
Living people
Chinese footballers
Footballers from Shanwei
People from Lufeng
Association football midfielders
Zhejiang Professional F.C. players
Hunan Billows players
Qingdao F.C. players
Chinese Super League players
China League One players
China League Two players
Footballers at the 2014 Asian Games
Asian Games competitors for China